Democratic Socialism (SD) is a Chilean centre-left political coalition established on 2021, by the Socialist Party, Party for Democracy, Radical Party, Liberal Party and the platform New Deal.

The pact emerged after the de facto dissolution of the New Social Pact and did not include the Christian Democratic Party, which meant the end of the historic alliance between socialist and christian democrats, which had been in force since the transition to democracy in 1990.

In December 2021, Democratic Socialism was called to be part of the government of President Gabriel Boric. The parties joined a coalition with Apruebo Dignidad and came to government on March 11, 2022.

International relations 
On February 22, 2022, the leaders of the alliance traveled to Madrid, Spain, where they held a political meeting with former Prime Minister José Luis Rodríguez Zapatero (PSOE).

Composition

References

Political party alliances in Chile
Political parties established in 2021
Social democratic parties in South America